Andrija Simović (born 11 March 1995,Belgrade,Serbia) is a Serbian professional basketball player, currently playing as a power forward for KK Vojvodina, Novi Sad of the Basketball League of Serbia.

External links 
 Profile at abaliga.com
 Profile at eurobasket.com
 Profile at beobasket.net

1995 births
Living people
ABA League players
Basketball players from Belgrade
Basketball League of Serbia players
KK Mega Basket players
KK Radnik Surdulica players
KK Smederevo players
KK Vršac players
KK Vojvodina players
Serbian expatriate basketball people in Spain
Serbian men's basketball players
Power forwards (basketball)